Lo Shue Tin, sometimes transliterated as Lo Shu Tin is a village in Sha Tin District, Hong Kong.

Administration
Lo Shu Tin is a recognized village under the New Territories Small House Policy.

See also
 Gilwell Campsite
 Kau Yeuk (Sha Tin)

References

Villages in Sha Tin District, Hong Kong